Herbert Thompson Jr. (December 11, 1933 – August 16, 2006) was an American prelate of the Episcopal Church, who served as the eighth Bishop of Southern Ohio between 1992 and 2005.

Early life and education
Thompson was born in 1933, in The Bronx, New York City, and was raised in Harlem and Fort Greene, Brooklyn. He served in the United States Air Force between 1952 and 1956. He then graduated from Lincoln University in 1962 with a Bachelor of Arts, and enrolled at the General Theological Seminary, graduating in 1965 with a Master of Divinity. He also graduated with a Doctor of Ministry from the United Theological Seminary in 1992, and was awarded honorary doctorates from Berkeley College, Bexley Hall, the General Theological Seminary, Kenyon College, and the Hebrew Union Theological Seminary.

Ordained Ministry
Thompson was ordained deacon and priest in 1965 for the Episcopal Diocese of Long Island. He then became vicar of St Gabriel's Church in Brooklyn, serving till 1971 after becoming rector of Christ Church in Bellport, New York. In 1977, he became rector of Grace Church in Jamaica, Queens, where he remained till 1988. He also served as a deputy to General Convention for the Diocese of Long Island, president of the Standing Committee, a Canon of the Cathedral chapter of the Cathedral of the Incarnation, deputy to provincial synod, and executive director of Interfaith Services of Brooklyn.

Bishop
In 1988, Thompson was elected Coadjutor Bishop of Southern Ohio, and was consecrated on September 24, 1988, by Presiding Bishop Edmond L. Browning. He succeeded as diocesan bishop in 1992, and retired in 2005. He died while on vacation in Italy on August 16, 2006.

References

1933 births
2006 deaths
African-American Episcopalians
United States Air Force airmen
Lincoln University (Pennsylvania) alumni
General Theological Seminary alumni
20th-century American Episcopalians
Episcopal bishops of Southern Ohio
20th-century American clergy
20th-century African-American people